Phú Lộc is a rural district of Thừa Thiên Huế province in the North Central Coast region of Vietnam. As of 2003 the district had a population of 149,418. The district covers an area of 728 km². The district capital lies at Phú Lộc.  

The area abuts the South China Sea to the east and the Hải Vân Pass to the south. The city of Phú Lộc is the main economic focal point of the district, mainly due to tourism.

The district comprises the townships of Lăng Cô and Phú Lộc, and the communes of Lộc Trì, Lộc Bổn, Vinh Hải, Lộc Hòa, Lộc An, Lộc Bình, Lộc Thủy, Vinh Giang, Lộc Vĩnh, Vinh Mỹ, Lộc Sơn, Lộc Tiến, Vinh Hiền, Vinh Hưng, Xuân Lộc and Lộc Điền.
 
The district is divided into three sectors, from Huế and moving southwards towards Phú Lộc is Sector 1, opposite is Sector 2, and the region between Lăng Cô and Phú Lộc is Sector 3.

References

Districts of Thừa Thiên Huế province